Dayaram Chaudhary is an Indian politician and a member of 17th Legislative Assembly of Basti, Uttar Pradesh of India. He represents the Basti Sadar constituency of Uttar Pradesh and is a member of the Bharatiya Janata Party.

Political career
Chaudhary has been a member of the 17th Legislative Assembly of Uttar Pradesh. Since 2017, he has represented the Basti Sadar constituency and is a member of the BJP. He is a face of Kurmi caste in Basti division.

Posts held

See also
Uttar Pradesh Legislative Assembly

References

Uttar Pradesh MLAs 2017–2022
Bharatiya Janata Party politicians from Uttar Pradesh
Living people
Year of birth missing (living people)